Jean-Baptiste-Thomas-Victor Cochinat (19 January 1819 – October 1886) was a 19th-century French lawyer, journalist and man of letters. He authored political articles under the pseudonyms Maxime Leclerc, Louis de Roselay etc. He was Chief editor of the Figaro-Programme in 1856 and of Le Foyer from 23 April 1858 to 2 February 1859.

Works 
1853: La Chaîne
1858–1859: Le Billard  
1859: Le guide des fumeurs
1859: Hygiène des fumeurs

External links 
 Victor Cochinat on Data.bnf.fr

1819 births
1886 deaths
Martiniquais journalists
Martiniquais lawyers
19th-century French lawyers
19th-century French journalists
French male journalists
19th-century French male writers